The Baptist Union of Poland (or Union of Christian Baptists) is an association of Baptist churches in the country of Poland. It is a member of the Polish Ecumenical Council, the European Baptist Federation and the Baptist World Alliance. The headquarters is in Warsaw.

History
Modern Baptist work began in Poland in 1844. The first typical Polish congregation was formed in the village of Zelow in 1872. Polish Baptists adopted the German Baptist Confession of 1847 as their own confession.

In 1922, the Union of Slavic Baptists in Poland was formed, and the Union of the Baptist Churches of the German Language was formed in 1928.The unions of German-speaking and Polish-speaking Baptists existed until World War II, when they were forced into a merger with other evangelical Christian bodies. In 1946, the Polish Evangelical Christian-Baptist Church was founded. The Biblical Theological Seminary in Wrocław, now an interdenominational work, was started by the Baptist Union in 1994.

According to a denomination census released in 2020, it claimed 102 churches and 5,390 members.

See also
 Baptists in Ukraine
 Brotherhood of Independent Baptist Churches and Ministries of Ukraine
 Evangelical Baptist Union of Ukraine
 Baptist beliefs
 Worship service (evangelicalism)
 Jesus Christ
 Believers' Church

References

Sources
Baptists Around the World, by Albert W. Wardin, Jr.
Gottfried Alf: Pioneer of the Baptist Movement in Poland, by Albert W. Wardin, Jr.
The Baptist Heritage: Four Centuries of Baptist Witness, by H. Leon McBeth

External links
Adherents.com
Baptist Union of Poland Official site
Baptist mission work Poland, Stargard Official site

Protestantism in Poland
Christian organizations established in 1947
Baptist denominations in Europe
Baptist denominations established in the 20th century
1947 establishments in Poland